Nur 'Ali (meaning 'Light of Ali') is a Muslim male given name also used in surnames.

Given name
Nur Ali Elahi
Nur-Ali Khalifa
Nur-Ali Shushtari
Nuraly Alip
Nuraly khan
Nurali Yusifbayli

Surname
Gözel Nuralyýewa
Azat Nurghaliyev
Bolat Nurghaliyev